The south bank of the Humber Estuary in England is a relatively unpopulated area containing large scale industrial development built from the 1950s onward, including national scale petroleum and chemical plants as well as gigawatt scale gas fired power stations.

Historically the south bank was undeveloped, and mostly unpopulated, excluding the medieval port of Grimsby and lesser havens at Barton upon Humber and Barrow upon Humber. Industrial activity increased from the 19th century onwards, primarily brick and tile works utilising the clay extracted from the banks of the Humber; this plus the addition of chalk extraction at the edge of the Lincolnshire Wolds formed the basis of cement industries. Grimsby expanded during the industrial 19th century, and Immingham Dock was established in 1911, and a large scale cement works established near South Ferriby in 1938. Most of the brick and tile works ceased operation in around the 1950s.

From the 1950s onwards a number of chemical plants were built between Immingham and Grimsby, and two major oil refineries built south of Immingham Dock in the 1960s. Growth and development of the oil and chemical industries took place through the 20th century with some contraction of chemical works occurring in the late 20th century.

At the end of the 20th century and beginning of the 21st century a number of combined cycle gas turbine  power stations were built (see also dash for gas), some of which  utilised 'waste' steam to provide nearby petroleum and chemical plants with heat energy. During the same time frame a large area of former clay workings from earlier brick and tile activity was converted into water parks in the Barton area.

Grimsby – Immingham

Background

The port of Grimsby, was a significant local town and market in the medieval period, with fish being the predominant traded good. From around the 14th century the port's importance in international trade diminished, in part due to competition from Hull, Boston, as well as the Hanseatic League; whilst coastal trade and inland waterway trade became more important. In addition to fish a trade foodstuffs also took place, as well as coals from Newcastle and the export of peat dug in Yorkshire. Grimsby's population declined from around 1,400 in 1377 to around 750 by 1600 and to around 400 by the early 1700s. In the late 1700s a new dock was built at Grimsby, under the engineer John Rennie, opened 1800. In the 1840s the Sheffield, Ashton-under-Lyne and Manchester Railway constructed a rail line to the town, and a new dock was constructed in the same period; the town redeveloped as a port, and its growth re-initiated. Several new docks constructed between 1850 and 1900 with a third fish dock added in 1934. Rail connections linked the port to South Yorkshire, Lancashire and the Midlands; the net tonnage handled by the port increased from 163,000 in the 1850s to 3,777,000 by 1911. The port was also a major fishing centre, landing around 20% of the total UK catch (1934). The town's population rose consistently from 1,500 in 1801, to 75,000 in 1901, and to 92,000 in 1931. Neighbouring Cleethorpes also developed as a residential area for Grimsby as well as a seaside resort during the 19th century. In the 20th century, port based industries formed the main economic activities, with fishing being particularly important, influencing other industries in the town, specifically food processing, in particular frozen foods. In the late 1960s around 3,500 were employed directly in the fishing industry; 10,000 were employed in food industries of which 6,000 was fish processing activities; 2,500 in shipbuilding and repair; other lesser employment activities included engineering, and timber related businesses. Most of Grimsby's industries were concentrated on the Dock's estate, and later Pyewipe, west of the main centre.

In 1911 Immingham Dock was opened, constructed for the Great Central Railway, primarily for the export of coal; the new dock was located at a point where the deep water channel of the Humber Estuary swung close to the south bank, with estuary side jetties that and could handle ships up to 30,000 deadweight tonnage. In the interwar period industry was developed on the north bank of the Humber in out of town locations: petroleum refining at Salt End (BP Saltend); smelting and cement manufacture at Melton (Capper Pass and the Humber Cement Works); and aircraft at Brough (Blackburn Aeroplane & Motor Company, later British Aerospace).

During the 1970s and early 1980s the fishing industry of Grimsby declined (to less than 15% of 1970 levels by tonnage by 1983) due to fuel costs (1973 fuel crisis), decline in fish stocks, Icelandic exclusion zones (see cod war), and new EEC fishing limits, though the port's market share remained roughly constant at around 20%, imported landings from Icelandic ships (as well as from ships of Norway, Faroes, Denmark, Belgium and Holland) became important to the continuation of Grimsby's role as a  'fish port'.

Industrialisation (1950–)
After the end of the Second World War the Humber bank and area between Grimsby and Immingham began to be developed by capital intensive industries, main focused on petroleum and chemicals. In addition to access to a modern port (Immingham) the regional advantages were availability of large areas of undeveloped flat land at low cost, with the Humber allowing discharge or effluent. The area was earmarked as being suitable for 'special' industries, such as those dealing with hazardous products or processes. Several large conglomerates or their subsidiaries acquired land banks in the area, and began developing industrial sites.

Grimsby Corporation acquired  of land between 1946 and 1953, who then improved the road and rail links, and sought industrial developers. An additional  was acquired by the corporation in Great Coates in 1960 and developed into a light industrial estate. Developers included British Titan Products (1949, titanium dioxide pigment), Fisons (1950, phosphate fertilizer), CIBA Laboratories (1951, pharmaceuticals), Laporte Industries (1953, titanium dioxide pigment), Courtaulds (1957, viscose and acrylic fibres). A limit to development was the fresh water supply available to industry. As a consequence additional sources of supply were sought by the water board.

In the late 1960s two oil refineries were established near Immingham: (Total-Fina and Continental Oil) supplied from an estuary pier beyond Cleethorpes at Tetney.

Initially rail transport links were good, but road transport infrastructure very poor, essentially rural lanes. In the late 1960s the government identified the Humber region generally as suitable for large scale industrial development; subsequently development of the road networks on both banks was authorised (see M180 motorway, also M62), as well as the construction of the Humber Bridge.

A number of proposed or potential large scale developments in the latter part of the 20th century were not taken forward: The CEGB acquired a  site near Killingholme in 1960, and obtained consent for a 4 GW oil fired power station in 1972; the project was abandoned after the 1973 oil crisis; in 1985 the Killingholme site was listed as a possible NIREX disposal site for low level nuclear waste; in 1986 the CEGB listed Killingholme as a potential site for a coal fired power station; A plan to reclaim land from the Humber at Pyewipe west of Grimsby using colliery waste was supported by Great Grimsby borough council as a potential source of new development land, interest in a reclamation scheme dated from at least the mid 1970s, and a report in the 1980s found the scheme feasible but expensive, the scheme was not supported by Humberside County Council who had sufficient development land elsewhere; Dow chemicals also acquired  of land in the 1970s.

By 1987 9,000 were employed in the South Humber bank area (excluding Grimsby-Cleethorpes, and rural north Lincolnshire).

During the 1990s dash for gas several gas turbine powered power stations with heat recovery steam generators were built in the area, including several gigawatt class output units: National Power and Powergen built adjacent 665 and 900 MW combined cycle gas turbine (CCGT) power stations  near North Killingholme in the early 1990s; Humber Power Ltd. built CCGT plant  in two phases (1994–1999), with final power output 1.2 GW; and ConocoPhillips built a combined heat and power plant using Gas turbine/HRSG/auxiliary boilers in two phases (opened 2004, about 730 MW and 2009, about 480 MW), used to supply heat (steam) to both the Lindsey and Humber refineries.

The Humber Sea Terminal at North Killingholme Haven, is a modern RO-RO port terminal based on an estuary pier with  minimum water depth; as of 2014 the terminal is operated by Simon Group Ltd a subsidiary of C.RO Ports SA. Six Ro-Ro terminals were developed in 2000 (1&2), 2003 (3&4) and 2007 (5&6).

Despite these developments the general character of the north Lincolnshire area in 1990 was agricultural, much of it large scale arable farming on high grade land, a pattern that is unchanged at the beginning of the 21st century.

South Ferriby – Immingham
Barton upon Humber dates to the pre-Norman Conquest period, and was the location for a ferry crossing of the Humber from at least that period. The towns was once an important port, but declined after the establishment of Kingston upon Hull. The town remained an important port for north Lincolnshire, and in 1801 had a population of around 1,700, more than Grimsby. Due to the presence of suitable soil, brick and tile making was carried out in the Barton area; in the 1840s one tilery had been established for over a hundred years; chalk was also quarried in the area, from at least 1790. Other industries in 1840 included whiting manufacture, rope making, tanning, plus trade in agricultural produce.

Clay and chalk based industries

At Barton upon Humber clay had been extracted for tile making since at least the 18th century. Several brick and tile manufactures operated during the 19th century, with growth stimulated in part by the end of the Brick tax in 1850. By 1892 works included Ness End, West Field, Humber Brick and Tile, Barton, Morris's, Dinsdale-Ellis-Wilson, Garside's, Blyth's Ing, Burton's, Mackrill's (Briggs), Pioneer, Hoe Hill and Spencer's. The works extended along most of the Humber bank from Barton Cliff around 1 mile west of barton Haven to Barrow Haven. The works reduced in number during the first half of the 20th century. By the 1970 much of the foreshore had been extracted, and the majority of works were no longer active. Several of the works had industrial railways, generally connecting the  workings to the works; in some cases clay was exported directly, such as that supplied to G.T. Earle's cement works in Wilmington, Kingston upon Hull from the Humber Brick & Tile works.  Many of the Barton brick and tile works closed in the 1950s. As of 2009 the Blyth's tile works at Hoe Hill is still operational, producing tiles using non-modern methods at a small scale.

The clay extraction, and brick and tile industry extended further east along the Humber bank. There were further works at Barrow Haven, New Holland including the Old Ferry Brick Works and Barrow Tileries (Barrow); the Atlas, and New Holland Stock brick works east of Barrow haven, the Quebec Brick & Tile works approximately 1.5 miles east of New Holland, and scattered works eastward on the bank as far as South Killingholme Haven, as well as brick works as South Ferriby and along the New River Ancholme near Ferriby Sluice. A site at East Halton was used to supply G.T. Earle's  cement works in Stoneferry, whilst the same firm's Wilmington works was supplied with clay from pits near North Killingholme Haven (1909–13), and later from pits between Barton and Barrow on Humber (1913–69).

In the 1890s George Henry Skelsey used funds from a public listing of his company to build a cement plant, Port Adamant Works, at Barton, west of the Haven, replacing a site he had acquired in 1885 at Morley Street, Stoneferry, Hull in the 1880s. Clay and chalk for the process were sourced on site, with chalk brought from the New Cliff chalk quarry, by a short narrow gauge rail line. Initially the plant had a capacity of around 330t per week, using chamber kilns, supplemented by shaft kilns in around 1901 increasing weekly capacity by around 320 t. In 1911 the company became part of British Portland Cement Manufacturers, and a rotary kiln was installed in 1912 replacing the earlier kilns. The plant closed in 1927 after the acquisition and establishment by the parent company of the large Humber Cement Works and Hope Cement Works.

Adjacent west of the New Cliff quarry was Barton Cliff Quarry, (chalk) also connected by a short rail line to the Humber foreshore; the quarry closed 1915. To the south west was Leggott's Quarry, (also known as "Ferriby Quarry"), also connected by a short rail line to the foreshore. The two quarries supplied chalk, including to G.T. Earle's Stoneferry and Wilmington plants respectively.

In 1938 Eastwoods Ltd established a cement works near South Ferriby, west of Ferriby Sluice. The initial plant consisted of a single  rotary kiln with an output of around 200t per day by the wet process. Chalk was supplied from a quarry, Middlegate quarry, south east of South Ferriby, which was crushed at the quarry and transported to the cement plant by aerial ropeway, whilst clay was supplied from west adjacent west of the plant. In 1962 the plant became part of Rugby Portland Cement Co. Ltd. In 1967 a semi-dry process rotary kiln was installed and the first kiln ceased operating. In 1974 the excavations at the chalk quarry were extended below the chalk through a relatively thin layer of red chalk and carrstone to the underlying clay, which was also extracted for use in the process – a conveyor belt system was installed to transport the materials to plant; the clay extraction west of the plant then ceased. A second rotary kiln was added in 1978. Ownership passed to Rugby Group (1979), RMC (2000), and then to CEMEX 2005.

The company Sandtoft was established in 1904 as brick maker, and started tile production at Goxhill in 1934. Concrete tile manufacturing capacity was expanded during the 20th century.

BritAg fertilizers
A fertilizer works was established at Barton, near the river bank east of the Haven in 1874 by "The Farmers Company". In 1968 the owner A.C.C. (Associated Chemical Companies) established new chemically based fertilizer production at the site, including a 180t per day Nitric acid plant, a 317t per day ammonium nitrate plant, plus a 475t per day fertilizer plant. In 1965 A.C.C. became a full subsidiary of Albright and Wilson, including the Barton plant.

The fertilizer business of Albright and Wilson was acquired by ICI in 1983, Loss of UK market share caused ICI to close the plant in the late 1980s, as well as other fertilizer production facilities.

Subsequently, the site was sold to Glanford borough, and later redeveloped together with former brick yards as a park Water's Edge.

Other

In 1992 Kimberly-Clark established a large nappy mill outside Barton upon Humber, the plant was built at a cost of about £100,000, for the manufacture of Huggies nappies. The plant was closed in 2013, due to the company ceasing most of its production of nappies in the European market. In August 2013 Wren Kitchens took over the  site and began conversion of the  factory space into head offices, plus manufacturing and warehousing. In April 2020, Wren began an extension project to its facility at the cost of £130 million.

There are also private wharfs at Barton-upon-Humber (Waterside), Barrow Haven, and New Holland.

Redevelopments

At the Barton foreshore directly west of Barton Haven the brick works had been closed and demolished by 1955, and an extension of a fertilizer works, BritAg, was built on the site. Initially  the council planned to reclaim and clean up the land, and establish an industrial estate on site. The local authority failed to gain funding for the redevelopment and cleanup, and in 1996 Glanford's successor North Lincolnshire Council inherited the site and terminated the redevelopment plans due to their cost, instead undertaking to clean up the site and create a 'water park'. After remediation of the harmful chemical residues from the fertilizer operation the site was converted into a  county part, Water's Edge, incorporating the worked out clay pits as reed beds.

Tile and brickyards east of Barton Haven which were abandoned in the 1950s now form part of the  Far Ings National Nature Reserve, established in 1983 by the Lincolnshire Wildlife Trust.

From 2013/4 Leggott's (or Ferriby) quarry has been reused as an airsoft recreation site.

See also

Fos-sur-Mer (France), Europoort (Netherlands) – similar estuarine  areas with post war industrial development

Notes

References

Maps

Sources

Further reading

External links

Chemical plants of the United Kingdom
Economy of Lincolnshire
History of Lincolnshire
Humber
Humberside
Industry in England